Sinheung Station is a station of the Daejeon Metro Line 1 in Panam-dong, Dong District, Daejeon, South Korea.

Station Layout

External links
  Sinheung Station from Daejeon Metropolitan Express Transit Corporation

Daejeon Metro stations
Dong District, Daejeon
Railway stations opened in 2006